The 2011–12 RIT Tigers women's ice hockey team was the Tigers' 37th season of varsity hockey and last at the NCAA Division III level. They represented Rochester Institute of Technology in the 2011–12 NCAA Division III women's ice hockey season. The team was coached by Scott McDonald in his sixth season as the program's head coach and played all of their home games at the Frank Ritter Memorial Ice Arena.

The Tigers compiled a 23–1–1 record in the regular season; they hosted and won the ECAC West Tournament for the second straight year, and hosted the NCAA Frozen Four (national semifinals and finals) for the second straight year.  After a disappointment in the 2011 title game, the Tigers won the 2012 national championship on home ice.  It was the first national championship for any women's athletic team from RIT, and the third overall.

Three days later, the university officially announced their application to move the program to the Division I level for the 2012–13 season.

Standings

Roster

See also
2011–12 NCAA Division III women's ice hockey season

References

External links
 RIT Tigers women's ice hockey

RIT Tigers women's ice hockey seasons